María Ximena Ossandón Irarrázabal (born 13 December 1963) is a Chilean teacher and politician.

She was a counsellor of Puente Alto from 2008 to 2012. On 21 November 2021, she was re-elected in his position of deputy.

Biography

Early life
Daughter of Roberto Ossandón Valdés and Ximena Irarrázabal Correa, she is the sister of Manuel José Ossandón, former mayor of Pirque and Puente Alto as well as current senator. Similarly, she is mother of Bernardita Paul Ossandón, current counsellor of Puente Alto.

She grew up in a country house in Pirque, along with her brothers Roberto, Rafael, Ignacio, Manuel José and Olga. Then, the family moved to an apartment in the capital Santiago. First, Ximena studied at Colegio Los Andes. Later, she studied Pedagogy in English at the Pontificia Universidad Católica de Chile. Finally, from 2007 to 2009, she completed an Executive MBA at the University of the Andes ESE Business School.

She was in charge of the vice-presidency of the National Board of Kindergartens (JUNJI) from March and December 2010 during Sebastián Piñera's first government.

Political career
In 2008, she successfully run to be counsellor of Puente Alto in the municipal elections. In that way, she accompanied to her brother in the municipality because Manuel José was already mayor of the commune since 2000.

In the 2013 Chilean general elections, Ximena decided to run for a seat in the Chamber of Deputies of Chile representing the then 26th District of La Florida. However, she failed to reach her goal.

In 2017, finally she reached a seat as deputy for the 2018−2022 now representing the new 12th District composed by La Florida, La Pintana, Pirque, Puente Alto and San José de Maipo.

On 21 November 2021, she was reelected in his position representing the 12th District. Days later, she announced her vote for José Antonio Kast in the ballotage of the 2021 Chilean general election.

References

External links
 BCN Profile

Living people
1963 births
21st-century Chilean politicians
National Renewal (Chile) politicians
Pontifical Catholic University of Chile alumni
University of the Andes, Chile alumni
People from Viña del Mar